Renata Leonardo Pereira Sochaczewski (born 21 February 1947), known professionally as Renata Sorrah, is a Brazilian actress. She is best known for portraying Nazaré Tedesco in Senhora do Destino (2004).

Early life 
Sorrah was born in Rio de Janeiro, to Míriam Leonardo Pereira and Peter Sochaczewski, a German Jew.

In 1964 she joined a cultural exchange program and went to Los Angeles, where she took dramatic arts classes and finished her studies. At that time California was the heart of the hippie movement and that influenced Sorrah's style.

When Sorrah returned to Brazil in 1967, she saw that the Brazilian cultural scene had hippie ideals. Even though she hadn't been a hippie, she adopted the hippie style.

Personal life 
Sorrah was married three times. She has a daughter, Mariana Simões, whose father is the director Marcos Paulo.

Selected filmography
 Killed the Family and Went to the Movies (1969)
 Avaete, Seed of Revenge (1985)
 Vale Tudo (1988)
 Rainha da Sucata (1990)
 Pedra sobre Pedra (1992)
 Pátria Minha (1994)
 A Indomada (1997)
 Andando nas Nuvens (1999)
 Um Anjo Caiu do Céu (2001)
 Desejos de Mulher (2002)
 Madame Satã (2002)
 Nina (2004)
 Senhora do Destino (2004)
 Páginas da Vida (2006)
 Duas Caras (2007)
 Fina Estampa (2011)
 Saramandaia (2013)
 Geração Brasil (2014)
 A Regra do Jogo (2015)
 Segundo Sol (2018)
 Diário de um Confinado (2020)

Meme
Sorrah was featured in a meme that went viral in 2010. The viral has its origins in a scene from the 2004 telenovela Senhora do Destino, which was widely popular in Brazil at the time, having good results even when reprised. Nazaré Tedesco, Sorrah's character in the show, is one of the most famous villains in the history of Brazilian telenovelas, and different memes involving her are popular in the country. However, this particular meme, which shows the actress with a confused look, usually accompanied by overwhelming mathematical formulas, has gone beyond Brazilian borders, being used internationally. According to the website Know Your Meme, the oldest known use of the meme dates from 2013.

References

External links
 

1947 births
Living people
Actresses from Rio de Janeiro (city)
Brazilian people of German-Jewish descent
Brazilian television actresses
Brazilian telenovela actresses